The Fujitsu Ladies is an annual golf tournament for professional female golfers on LPGA of Japan Tour. It is generally played in October and in recent years at the Tokyu Seven Hundred Club, Chiba, Chiba. It was founded in 1983.

Winners 
2022 Ayaka Furue
2021 Ayaka Furue
2020 Jiyai Shin
2019 Ayaka Furue
2018 Misuzu Narita
2017 Teresa Lu
2016 Ayaka Matsumori
2015 Teresa Lu
2014 Ahn Sun-ju
2013 Lee Na-ri
2012 Misuzu Narita
2011 Saiki Fujita
2010 Ahn Sun-ju
2009 Nikki Campbell
2008 Yuri Fudoh
2007 Sakura Yokomine
2006 Jeon Mi-jeong
2005 Yuri Fudoh
2004 Michiko Hattori
2003 Yuri Fudoh
2002 Chihiro Nakajima
2001 Yuri Fudoh
2000 Michie Ohba
1999 Michiko Hattori
1998 Kaori Higo
1997 Aiko Takase
1996 Akiko Fukushima
1995 Hiromi Kobayashi
1994 Kikuko Shibata
1993 Mayumi Hirase
1992 Patti Rizzo
1991 Ikuyo Shiotani
1990 Chieko Nishida
1989 Amy Benz
1988 Aiko Takasu
1987 Atsuko Hikage
1986 Hisako Higuchi
1985 Tomiko Ikebuchi
1984 Nayoko Yoshikawa
1983 Nayoko Yoshikawa

LPGA of Japan Tour events
1983 establishments in Japan
Recurring sporting events established in 1983